"Radiate" is a song by American musician Jack Johnson from his 2013 album From Here to Now to You. The song is the second single from the album, and was released on September 16, 2013.

Composition 
Radiate was written in 2011 about Johnson's 6-year-old son playing in his backyard world.

Release 
The song was released on September 16, 2013, which was a day before the album release. The song was released as a digital download, one track CD, and an exclusive 7" inch vinyl was released on December 23, 2017.

Music video 
For the official music video, On August 7, 2013 Jack collaborated with the organization OMG and "The Daniels." The video features many summer campers coming up with ideas to make Jack Johnson's video, and all the ideas are explained. The video was released on October 28, 2013.

Track listing

CD Single 
 "Radiate" - 4:15
 "Radiate (Radio Edit)" - 3:00

7" vinyl 
 "Radiate" - 4:15
 "Mudfootball"  - 4:55

The Switch Remixes 

 "Radiate" (Switch remix) - 3:44
 "Radiate" (Switch Dub remix) - 4:04

Charts

References 

Jack Johnson (musician) songs
Songs written by Jack Johnson (musician)
2013 songs
2013 singles